Michael ffrench-O'Carroll (15 September 1919 – 5 May 2007) was an Irish politician and medical doctor. He was an independent Teachta Dála (TD) and Senator. He served one term in each house of the Oireachtas in the 1950s.

Born in Dublin, he qualified in medicine at Trinity College Dublin. He married Renee Marie de la Laforcade in 1944. He joined Clann na Poblachta at the same time as Noël Browne, though he did not stand at the 1948 general election. He became a Clann na Poblachta member of Dublin City Council in 1950.

He was elected to Dáil Éireann on his first attempt, as an independent candidate at the 1951 general election for the Dublin South-West constituency. He took the fourth seat in the 5-seat constituency, defeating Fine Gael TD Michael O'Higgins. His former party leader Seán MacBride was also elected in the same constituency. Taking his seat in the 14th Dáil, he supported the Fianna Fáil government on most issues.

In October 1953 he joined Fianna Fáil together with Noël Browne. He stood again in Dublin South-West at the 1954 general election, this time as a Fianna Fáil candidate, but lost his seat to O'Higgins. He then contested the 1954 Seanad Éireann elections as an independent candidate on the Cultural and Educational Panel, and was elected to the 8th Seanad.

At the 1957 general election, he was again an unsuccessful Fianna Fáil candidate in Dublin South-West. He was not re-elected to the Seanad.

He later became a pioneer in the field of addiction care. He established an out-patient centre at Arbour House in Cork. He also helped establish a residential programme for young adult heroin addicts at Cuan Mhuire in Athy. He published a book on addiction in 1995. He died on 5 May 2007.

References

1919 births
2007 deaths
Clann na Poblachta politicians
Independent TDs
Fianna Fáil politicians
Members of the 14th Dáil
Members of the 8th Seanad
20th-century Irish medical doctors
Local councillors in Dublin (city)
Independent members of Seanad Éireann